Larry Davis may refer to:

 Larry Davis (basketball) (born 1956), assistant men's basketball coach at the University of Cincinnati
 Larry Davis (blues musician) (1936–1994), American Texas blues musician
 Larry Davis (New York) (1966–2008), New York City criminal defendant
 Larry M. Davis (1943–2006), American psychiatrist
 Larry S. Davis, American computer scientist
 L. J. Davis (1940–2011) American writer 
 Crash Davis (Lawrence Davis, 1919–2001), American professional baseball player